Frank Walter Springfield (22 August 1887 – 9 July 1958) was Brisbane-based Australian swimmer. Together with Victorian swimmer Frank Beaurepaire, he competed in three freestyle events at the 1908 Summer Olympics.  His races included the half-mile.

The year 1906 saw him win the inaugural Kieran Shield.  His brother Sidney 'Sid' Henry Springfield also swam competitively as an amateur.  Both were members of the Valley Swimming Club, and Frank was made life member of the Queensland Swimming Association in 1953.

References

External links
 

1887 births
1958 deaths
Australian male freestyle swimmers
Olympic swimmers of Australasia
Swimmers at the 1908 Summer Olympics
Sportsmen from Queensland